The Eddie Robinson Award is awarded annually to college football's top head coach in the NCAA Division I Football Championship Subdivision (formerly Division I-AA). The award was established by The Sports Network, since merged into Stats Perform, in 1987 and is voted upon by the division's sports information directors and selected sports writers.  The award is named for Eddie Robinson, the College Football Hall of Fame coach, who retired in 1997 after 56 years at Grambling State University.

Along with the Walter Payton Award and Buck Buchanan Award, it is presented the night before the annual NCAA Division I Football Championship.

Winners

References

External links
Eddie Robinson Award - Past winners from The Sports Network

College football coach of the year awards in the United States
Awards established in 1987